Cyril Henry Atwell Porter (12 January 1890 – 16 January 1964) was a British track and field athlete who competed mainly long-distance running. He was born in Bridstow, Herefordshire.

He competed for Great Britain in the 1912 Summer Olympics held in Stockholm, Sweden in the 3000 metre team where he won the bronze medal with his teammates Joe Cottrill and George Hutson. Porter studied at Brasenose College, Oxford.

References

1890 births
1964 deaths
Sportspeople from Herefordshire
English male long-distance runners
Olympic athletes of Great Britain
Olympic bronze medallists for Great Britain
Athletes (track and field) at the 1912 Summer Olympics
Alumni of Brasenose College, Oxford
Medalists at the 1912 Summer Olympics
Olympic bronze medalists in athletics (track and field)